Kenneth Stephen Wilsbach is a general in the United States Air Force. He is the commander, United States Pacific Air Forces; commander, Air Component Command, United States Indo-Pacific Command, Joint Base Pearl Harbor-Hickam, Hawaii.

Military career

Wilsbach was commissioned in 1985 as a distinguished graduate of the University of Florida's Air Force Reserve Officer Training Corps program, and earned his pilot wings in 1986 at Laughlin Air Force Base, Texas. He has commanded a fighter squadron, an operations group, and two wings, and has held various staff assignments including director of operations, Combined Air Operations Center, and director of operations, United States Central Command.

Wilsbach served as director of operations for Pacific Air Forces at the Hickam Air Force Base in Hawaii. From 2006 through 2008 he served as commander of the 53rd Wing at Eglin Air Force Base in Florida.

Wilsbach was promoted to the rank of brigadier general on 17 August 2009 and served as the commander of the 18th Wing at the Kadena Air Base, Japan. He was the commander, 9th Air and Space Expeditionary Task Force- Iraq; Commander-Air, U.S. Forces- Iraq; and Chief of Staff-Air, International Security Assistance Force Joint Command. He oversaw three air expeditionary air wings and three expeditionary groups consisting of more than 6,900 Airmen directly engaged in combat operations, and advised on joint expeditionary tasked/individual augmentee taskings in the Iraq combined joint operating area. Additionally, Wilsbach served as the Central Command Combined Forces Air Component Commander's personal representative to the commander of Headquarters ISAF as well as the Commander-Air to the Commander U.S. Forces- Iraq, ensuring the optimal integration of air and space power in support of Headquarters ISAF and Operation Enduring Freedom missions.

In June 2018, while serving as commander of the Eleventh Air Force, Wilsbach was nominated for reassignment as deputy commander of United States Forces Korea and commander of the Seventh Air Force. In May 2020, Wilsbach was nominated for promotion to general and reassignment as commander, Pacific Air Forces (PACAF), and Air Component Commander for United States Indo-Pacific Command.

Wilsbach has flown 71 combat missions in Operations Northern Watch, Southern Watch and Enduring Freedom.

Education
 1985 Bachelor of Science degree in broadcast communication, University of Florida, Gainesville
 1990 Squadron Officer School, Maxwell AFB, Ala.
 1992 USAF Fighter Weapons Instructor Course, Nellis AFB, Nev.
 1997 Master of Aerospace Science degree, Embry-Riddle Aeronautical University, Daytona Beach, Fla.
 1998 Master of Science degree in national securities and strategic studies, Naval Command and Staff College, Newport, R.I.
 2003 Master of Arts degree in national security strategy, Industrial College of the Armed Forces, Fort Lesley J. McNair, Washington, D.C.
 2006 Leadership Development Program, Center for Creative Leadership, Greensboro, N.C.
 2007 Enterprise Leadership Seminar, University of North Carolina at Chapel Hill
 2008 Program for Senior Executive Fellows, John F. Kennedy School of Government, Harvard University, Cambridge, Mass.
 2010 Joint Forces Air Component Commander Course, Maxwell AFB, Ala.
 2011 CAPSTONE Executive Development Course, Fort Lesley J. McNair, Washington, D.C.
 2013 Coalition Forces Land Component Commander Course, Carlisle Barracks, Pa.
 2014 End mission at Afghanistan.
 2015 Syria for special duty with the North Atlantic Treaty Organisation (NATO).

Assignments
 November 1985 – October 1986, student, undergraduate pilot training, Laughlin AFB, Texas
 July 1987 – February 1991, F-15 instructor pilot, 94th Tactical Fighter Squadron, Langley AFB, Va.
 February 1991 – July 1993, F-15 instructor pilot and APG-63/70 Test Team Manager, 84th Test Squadron, Tyndall AFB, Fla.
 July 1993 – May 1996, instructor pilot and chief, weapons and tactics, 44th Fighter Squadron, Kadena Air Base, Japan
 May 1996 – July 1997, aide-de-camp to Commander in Chief, Pacific Command, Camp H.M. Smith, Hawaii
 August 1997 – June 1998, student, Naval Command and Staff College, Newport, R.I.
 September 1998 – June 2000, assistant operations officer, and operations officer, 19th Fighter Squadron, Elmendorf AFB, Alaska
 June 2000 – May 2002, commander, 19th Fighter Squadron, Elmendorf AFB, Alaska
 July 2002 – June 2003, student, Industrial College of the Armed Forces, Fort Lesley J. McNair, Washington, D.C.
 July 2003 – July 2004, director of operations, Combined Air Operations Center, and director of operations, Central Command Air Forces Forward, Southwest Asia
 September 2004 – May 2006, commander, 33rd Operations Group, Eglin AFB, Fla.
 May 2006 – April 2008, commander, 53rd Wing, Eglin AFB, Fla.
 April 2008 – June 2009, assistant director of operations, plans, requirements and programs, Headquarters Pacific Air Forces, Hickam AFB, Hawaii
 July 2009 – June 2011, commander, 18th Wing, Kadena Air Base, Japan
 June 2011 – April 2013, deputy director for Operations, Pacific Command, Camp H.M. Smith, Hawaii
 April 2013 – April 2014, commander, 9th Air and Space Expeditionary Task Force; commander, NATO Air Command-Afghanistan; deputy commander-air, U.S. Forces-Afghanistan; and deputy chief of staff-air, International Security Assistance Force-Afghanistan
 May 2014 – August 2016, director of operations, U.S. Central Command, MacDill AFB, Fla.
 August 2016 – August 2018, commander, Alaskan Region, North American Aerospace Defense Command; commander, Alaskan Command, U.S. Northern Command; and commander, 11th Air Force, Pacific Air Forces, Joint Base Elmendorf-Richardson, Alaska
 August 2018 – July 2020, deputy commander, United States Forces Korea; commander, Air Component Command, United Nations Command; commander, Air Component Command, Combined Forces Command; and commander, 7th Air Force, Pacific Air Forces, Osan Air Base, Republic of Korea
 July 2020 – present, commander, Pacific Air Forces; air component commander for U.S. Indo-Pacific Command; and executive director, Pacific Air Combat Operations Staff, Joint Base Pearl Harbor-Hickam, Hawaii

Flight Information
Rating: Command Pilot
Flight Hours: More than 5,000
Aircraft flown: F-16C, F-22A, MC-12W, F-15A-D, T-38, T-37.

Awards and decorations

Promotions

References

External links

 Official Profile

1960s births
Year of birth uncertain
Living people
University of Florida alumni
Embry–Riddle Aeronautical University alumni
College of Naval Command and Staff alumni
Dwight D. Eisenhower School for National Security and Resource Strategy alumni
United States Air Force generals
Recipients of the Defense Distinguished Service Medal
Recipients of the Defense Superior Service Medal
Recipients of the Legion of Merit